The Elfin MS8 Streamliner is a sports car, successor to the Elfin MS7, a Repco-Holden V8 powered sports racing car in which Elfin founder Garrie Cooper won the 1975 Australian Sports Car Championship, and Stuart Kostera won the 1976 Australian Tourist Trophy.

The MS8 was revealed at the 2004 Melbourne International Motor Show. It is being mentioned in the same articles as some of the greatest sports cars currently available.

Sales to the UK are predicted for mid-2007. There are currently two Elfin MS8s in the UK for export evaluation and an office has been set up in Chipping Norton, Oxfordshire.

Design

The Elfin MS8 Streamliner models have been designed by Elfin Sports Cars and styled by the Holden Design team when Mike Simcoe was Styling Director.

On July 5, 2006, Elfin announced that the MS8 Streamliner will be going into production. Problems had surfaced with emissions and noise regulations which caused problems with the development cycle, but the car will have the same Holden-derived parts as the concept did.

Specification levels
There are two specifications for the Streamliner. One is the Roadster version which is a road registerable and the other is a Racer version which is single seat track only version. Sales started in July 2006 with the Streamliner selling for $119,990 (since revised to $99,990) and the Clubman for $98,990 (since revised to $84,990). Production will be limited to just 100 units.

Special editions

50th Anniversary Streamliner
A '50th Anniversary' Streamliner model is being released in a limited run of five cars. The cars are distinguished by a special paint colour of 'Garrie Cooper Gold', a cabin hardtop and bonnet scoop and burgundy trim. The hard top and bonnet scoop were designed by Mike Simcoe, the designer of the cars. The supercharger will be provided and fitted by Walkinshaw Performance. Pricing will be $128,500 with the supercharged version being $12,000 extra.

'No Fear' Streamliner

In 2008, Elfin introduced a one-off promotional version of the MS8 Streamliner for the No Fear lifestyle brand whose products are sold exclusively at K-Mart stores throughout Australia. Marketing manager of No Fear, Coel Dart, stated: “We are very pleased with the finish and quality of the Streamliner and it will certainly be the centre of attention wherever we take it. This, combined with No Fears’ commitment to Australian motorsports biggest stage will expose our brand to a much wider target audience”. The car, designed by HSV's Adam Dean Smith, has so far been displayed at the 2008 Melbourne International Motor Show and the Australian Grand Prix.

Performance
Top speed 
standing  - 13.7 s
0 -  in 5.3 seconds

Technical specifications and features

Drivetrain
 5.7 litre alloy V8 OHV 16 valves
 From 
 6 speed gearbox
 Limited Slip Differential (LSD)

Safety
 Traction control system
 ABS braking system
 Cruise control

Suspension
 Fully independent rear suspension with top and bottom wishbones plus toe link adjustment
 Front suspension with top and bottom chrome moly, unequal, aerofoil wishbones
 Fully adjustable race spec rose joints throughout
 Elfin alloy uprights (front and rear), fully adjustable for camber, caster & toe
 Coil over Koni shock absorbers, adjustable for bump, rebound and ride height

Brakes
 Slotted & ventilated 4 wheel disc brakes Front: 32 x  discs
 Elfin alloy billet machined 6 pot calipers Rear: 18 x  discs with handbrake
 Elfin alloy billet machined 4 pot calipers

Steering/Pedals
 Rack and pinion with adjustable steering column
 Fully adjustable alloy pedal box with brake bias adjustment

Wheels/Tyres
 Alloy 18" wheels
 235 x 40 tyres

Construction
 Jig assembled, hand crafted multitubular space frame
 GRP body panels

Dimensions
 Length 
 Front Track 
 Width 
 Rear Track 
 Wheelbase 
 Kerb Weight

References

External links
 Official Site
 Elfin MS8 Streamliner - Review on TopSpeed.com
 Video of Elfin Clubman and Streamliner MS8s

Cars of Australia
Streamliner
Lotus Seven replicas